Ian Harris (born November 16, 1952) is a former professional tennis player from the United States.

Biography
Harris appeared in the men's doubles main draw at the 1980 French Open and 1981 Wimbledon Championships. 

On the Grand Prix circuit he made the doubles quarter-finals at the Lagos Open in 1980 and the Columbus Open in 1981. His best performance in singles came at the Grand Prix Cleveland in 1981 when he reached the round of 16.

Both of his two Challenger titles were in doubles.

Now working as a tennis pro in Michigan, Harris also competes as an amateur golfer.

Challenger titles

Doubles: (2)

References

External links
 
 

1952 births
Living people
American male tennis players
Tennis people from Michigan